Dušanka Đokić-Ristanović (born November 22, 1938) is a former professor of theoretical physics at the Faculty of Physics, University of Belgrade.

Biography
Đokić performed research on theoretical physics, in particular involving canonical transformations in degenerate systems, and received her PhD degree in theoretical physics from the University of Belgrade in January 1976 with a thesis entitled "The Generalization of Dirac's Degenerate Systems Theory in Classic Field Theory". She published more than 20 articles in international journals and participated in many scientific conferences. During nearly four decades Đokić taught Theoretical mechanics and Classical physics to numerous generations of students. In 1973 she was awarded a special certificate of thanks by her students.

In 1960 Đokić co-initiated the annual statewide high school competition in physics and was the member of the competition jury for nearly two decades. In 1978 she initiated similar competition for primary school students. Later she co-authored a book, a collection of solved physics problems.

In the 1970s and 1980s she published numerous scientific articles on biophysics, mathematical modeling of biological processes, neurophysiology and biostatistics together with her husband Dušan Ristanović, professor of biophysics at the University of Belgrade, including work on dipole models for the visual cortex.

In September 1980 Đokić become a part-time professor at the Pedagogical Academy in Belgrade, and was elected Principal of the Academy in 1983. During her time of office as Principal she reformed the Academy and merged it with the Faculty of Physics, forming new two-subject undergraduate courses. In 1987 she returned to the Faculty of Physics and was elected Vice Dean for Finance and Administration in October 1991.

Đokić retired from active duty in 1996.

In Serbia, the number of women professors in physics has been relatively small, but is increasing since approximately 2000. Women are more prominent in teaching and mentoring students and in improving the environment for learning physics.

References

External links 
 Faculty of Physics, University of Belgrade

1938 births
Living people
Serbian physicists
University of Belgrade Faculty of Physics alumni
Serbian women physicists
Place of birth missing (living people)
Serbian women scientists
Academic staff of the University of Belgrade
Yugoslav scientists